The Gerhard Neumann Museum is an aviation museum located in the German village of Niederalteich in Bavaria. The museum chronicles the work of German aero engine designer, Gerhard Neumann, in particular the General Electric J79 turbojet and Lockheed F-104 Starfighter which this engine powered. Many aerospace exhibits are on display including fixed-wing aircraft and aircraft engines.

Aircraft on display
The museum has four examples of the Lockheed F-104, a Mikoyan-Gurevich MiG-21 and fuselage sections of other aircraft types.

Jet aircraft
Airbus A300 (fuselage section)
Eurofighter Typhoon (fuselage section)
Lockheed F-104G Starfighter, four airframes.
Hamburger Flugzeugbau HFB-320 Hansa Jet
MBB Lampyridae
Mikoyan-Gurevich MiG-21
Panavia Tornado (fuselage section)

Aircraft engines

Gas turbine engines
General Electric J79

See also
List of aerospace museums

References
Notes

External links

Official website.

Aerospace museums in Germany
Museums in Bavaria
Museums established in 2000
2000 establishments in Germany